The Party of the Vlachs of Macedonia (PVM; , ;), sometimes simply referred to as the Party of the Vlachs or the Vlach Party, is one of the two political parties in North Macedonia representative of the Aromanian minority of the country, the other being the Democratic Union of the Vlachs of Macedonia (DSVM).

It was founded in 2001 in Skopje by Mite Kostov Papuli, who was also a member of several many other Aromanian organizations of North Macedonia. Papuli died in 2020, at age 61, as a result of COVID-19.

In March 2020, the PVM joined a coalition with VMRO-DPMNE and many other North Macedonian political parties.

In 2021, a representative of PVM, the DSVM and some other Aromanian organizations of North Macedonia met with the President of North Macedonia Stevo Pendarovski on the occasion of the Aromanian National Day celebrated every 23 May and demanded a constituency with guaranteed seats on the Parliament of North Macedonia for representatives of the national Aromanian minority. The situation of the minority in the country and the progress made so far in their minority rights were also discussed.

See also
 Alliance for Equality and European Justice, the only Aromanian political party outside North Macedonia
 Democratic Union of the Vlachs of Macedonia, the other Aromanian political party in North Macedonia

References

2001 establishments in the Republic of Macedonia
Political parties established in 2001
Political parties of minorities in North Macedonia
Aromanian political parties
Aromanians in North Macedonia